Turmalina is the third (and to date, last) album by Uruguayan singer and actress Natalia Oreiro.

Background and production 

Turmalina was produced by Latin maker Kike Santander and reflects and important step forward in Natalia Oreiro's musical career. The album was recorded in US, in the middle of the artist's worldwide tour. Natalia travelled with her musicians from Russia to Miami, from Miami to Prague, from Prague to Bucarest, from Bucarest to Miami for several months.
Turmalina is a combination of rhythms such as rock, pop and some sort of reminiscent of the 70's and 80's sounds. It also combines murga, candombe and ballads. Everything carefully followed by guitar and percussion arrangements specially made by Uruguayan talent Jaime Roos.

On this album, Oreiro write and composed the songs: "Alas de libertad" (Wings of freedom), which is inspired by kids she met some time ago in the city of Jujuy, Argentina; "Mar" (Sea) tells the love story between a sailor and his girlfriend. Natalia also contributed to the lyrics of "Cayendo" (Falling).

"Que Digan Lo Que Quieran" (Let Them Say What They Want) is Turmalina's first single. "Cuesta arriba, cuesta abajo" is the song related to the soap opera "Runaway Lady".
The album had a simultaneous release in Argentina, Chile, Uruguay, Czech Republic, Russia, Hungary, Greece, Romania, Israel and Korea. Nearly 1.800.000 copies of this album have been sold worldwide.

Track listing

Personnel
Credits for Turmalina  adapted from Allmusic:

 Cristian Algañaraz – Engineer
 Amadeo Alvarez – Production Assistant
 Marcelo Añez – Engineer
 Daniel Báez – Engineer
 Mariano Barroso – Tambourine
 David Betancourt – Arranger, engineer, Keyboard Programming, producer
 Brendan Buckley – Bateria
 Ed Calle – Direcccion de Cuerdas, Guest Artist
 Coti – Composer
 Mike Couzzi – Engineer
 Tulio Cremisini – Composer
 Mike Fuller – Mastering
 Claudia Garcia – Coros
 José Gaviria – Arranger, composer, Coros, producer
 Martín Ibarburu – drums
 Jacqueline – Coro
 Juanes – Engineer
 Brian Kraz – Production Assistant
 Jose Lopera – drums
 Juan Cristobal Losada – Engineer
 Sergio Minski – Producer, Production Coordination
 Andrés Múnera – Arranger, Cuerda, engineer, Keyboard Programming, producer, Programming
 Alfredo Oliva – Concert Comedienne
 Natalia Oreiro – Artistic Director, composer, lead Artist
 Catalina Rodríguez – Coros
 Jaime Roos – Arranger, composer, engineer, Guitar (Bass), producer
 Manuel Sanchez – Engineer
 Kike Santander – Arranger, composer, Executive Producer, producer
 Richard Serotta – Production Assistant
 Andrés Felipe Silva – Executive Director
 Fernando Tobon – Arranger, Bajo Sexto, Guitar, Guitar (Bass), Guitar (Electroacoustic), producer
 Juan Jose Virviescas – Engineer

Charts

Weekly charts

Certifications

Release history

References

External links 

 Natalia Oreiro Official Site

Natalia Oreiro albums
2002 albums